The F. W. Woolworth Company Building is a historic department store building located in downtown Wilmington, Delaware.

History
From 1940 to 1997, the F. W. Woolworth Company operated the store, this location being one of the last to close. The building then housed a Happy Harry's drug store and pharmacy for several years until that company was purchased by Walgreens in 2007.  Walgreens continued to operate the acquired Happy Harry's stores, including the Market Street store, under the Happy Harry's name for some time.  The building was purchased by a subsidiary of BPG Property Group in 2008 who now leases the location back to Walgreens and it's opened under the Walgreens name.

Architecture

Designed by company architect H. W. Stakes, the art deco building uses steel frame construction with a masonry curtain wall.  The facade on the 2nd and 3rd stories displays alternating peach and cream vertical stripes of terra cotta tile with lotus motifs. The building has a grey medallion with a raised "W" on the chamfered corner on 9th and Market.

When a Woolworth's store, the interior had two sales floors, the current ground floor and the bargain basement.  The escalators to the basement floor are still visible in the store.

In 1959, Woolworth added a third story which appeared in the original blue prints.  BPG has plans to renovate the building's upper floors and to add an additional two stories to the building for use as apartments.

Location
The building stands at the shopping intersection of 9th and Market streets a block off Rodney Square at the heart of the central business district.  Woolworths also operated another store four blocks away at 504 Market Street.  That second location now houses the Delaware History Museum.

See also
 Woolworth Building
 Delaware Historical Society
 National Register of Historic Places listings in Wilmington, Delaware

References

External links

 NRHP Site Listing with Photo
 Downtown Wilmington 
 The Buccini/Pollin Group
 Woolworth Museum

Commercial buildings completed in 1940
Buildings and structures in Wilmington, Delaware
Commercial buildings on the National Register of Historic Places in Delaware
Department stores on the National Register of Historic Places
F. W. Woolworth Company buildings and structures
Art Deco architecture in Delaware
National Register of Historic Places in Wilmington, Delaware